Bradford (Park Avenue) Association Football Club is an association football club based in Bradford, West Yorkshire, England. The name derived from their former home at Park Avenue, and was used to avoid confusion with Bradford derby rivals Bradford City.

The club was founded in 1907 and moved from the Southern League into the Football League the next year. They were promoted into the First Division at the end of the 1913–14 season, but suffered consecutive relegations by 1922. They won the Third Division North title in 1927–28 and remained in the Second Division until 1950. Promoted from the Fourth Division in 1960–61, the club were relegated from the Third Division in 1963. The club failed in their Football League re-election bid in 1970 and spent the next four seasons in the Northern Premier League before disbanding.

The present club is a reincarnation that was established in 1987. They moved from the Central Midlands League into the North West Counties League in 1990, gaining promotion from Division Two in 1990–91. They moved into their present home at Horsfall Stadium in 1996 having previously won the North West Counties League Division One title, and then the Northern Premier League Premier Division in 2000–01. Relegated in two successive seasons in 2006, they won the Northern Premier League First Division title in 2007–08 and gained promotion from the Premier Division via the play-offs in 2012.

History

Rugby football

The original club was formed in 1863 as the Bradford Football Club, playing rugby football, and achieved its first major success by winning the Yorkshire Cup in 1884. A member of the Rugby Football Union (RFU), Bradford FC became a founding member of the breakaway Northern Rugby Football Union (after an internal RFU dispute over broken-time payments) in 1895. Bradford were runners-up the 1897–98 Challenge Cup, won the championship in 1903–04, and won the 1905–06 Challenge Cup.

In 1907, what is known as "The Great Betrayal" occurred when a narrow majority of members decided to abandon the Northern Union game (later known as rugby league) in favour of association football, still based at the Park Avenue ground. The minority faction left and formed a new club within the Northern Union, Bradford Northern. Bradford Northern applied for and was granted Bradford FC's place in the 1907–08 Northern Rugby Football Union season.

Association football

Bradford FC began playing association football in 1895, alternating home Saturdays at Park Avenue with the Northern Union. The club shared the West Yorkshire League championship with Hunslet in 1895–96, also winning the Leeds Workpeople's Hospital Cup. Bradford played in the FA Amateur Cup in 1896–97, progressing to the FA Cup in 1897–98 and 1898–99. It entered the Yorkshire League in 1897–98, finishing next to last, and was banished to Birch Lane the following season, closing down at the end of the 1898–99 season due to mounting losses.

The success of cross-town neighbours Manningham after switching to association football, (where it was renamed Bradford City A.F.C.), prompted the Northern Union club to abandon rugby in 1907 and apply to join the Football League. They were not accepted, instead joining the Southern League (although the club was based in the north) and filling a gap left by Fulham (who joined the Football League). Their nearest opponents were Northampton Town, whose ground was 130 miles distant.

In 1908, Bradford FC was elected to the Second Division of the Football League. The club was promoted to the First Division in 1914 after finishing second, and achieved its highest-ever league position (ninth) at the end of the 1914–15 season. In 1914, Donald Bell, a man who would go on to win the Victoria Cross, played four games. At the outbreak of war, he asked to be released to serve. Rising to the rank of lieutenant, in 1916 he received the VC for conspicuous bravery on the Somme before being killed five days later.

After the First World War the club began a steady decline, relegated to the Second Division in 1921 and to the Third Division North in 1922. In 1928, the club were the Division 3N champions and were promoted back to the Second Division. They were relegated again in 1950, and placed in the Fourth Division after a 1958 reorganisation. Although the club won promotion to the Third Division in 1961, they were relegated back to the Fourth Division in 1963.

After several difficult seasons, in 1970 they were replaced in the Football League by Cambridge United. The club joined the Northern Premier League, selling Park Avenue in 1973 and sharing facilities with Bradford City]]. Bradford (Park Avenue) went into liquidation on 3 May 1974 with debts of £57,652 and immediately re-formed as a Sunday league club playing in the league club's former colours.

After playing at Bingley Road and Hope Avenue in 1974 in Bradford Amateur Sunday League Division Four, the club moved to Avenue Road and won promotion in 1975. The next season, they were again promoted into the newly formed Bradford Sunday Alliance League.

Although the stands and other buildings at Park Avenue were demolished in 1980, the playing field and terraces remained. The stadium was renovated for amateur football during the mid-1980s, and the Sunday League club played a full season there in 1987–88. However, it was forced to move out at the end of the season to accommodate an indoor cricket school on part of the pitch.

A new club was formed to return Bradford (Park Avenue) to Saturday football for the 1988–89 season, joining the West Riding County Amateur Football League and then the Central Midlands League for 1989–90. The club moved to the North West Counties League from 1990 to 1991, playing matches at rugby-league grounds such as McLaren Field and Mount Pleasant, Batley. The Sunday side formed in 1974 merged with the new Saturday club in 1992. In 1995, Bradford (Park Avenue) won the North West Counties League, re-joining the Northern Premier League and a year later in 1996 moving to Horsfall Stadium.

At the beginning of the 2004–05 season they were founding members of the Conference North, although they were relegated to the Northern Premier League at the end of the season (after finishing seventh) and to Northern Division North the following season. The club returned to the Northern Premier League as champions in the 2007–08 season.

The club reached the FA Cup quarterfinals in 1912–13, 1919–20 and 1945–46. Since re-forming they have reached the first round three times, in 2003–04, 2011–12 and 2012–13. Since dropping into non-league football, the club's best FA Trophy performance has been the fourth round in 1998–99. In the FA Vase, the club reached the second round in 1994–95.

In February 2008, chief executive Bob Blackburn unveiled plans for a 20,000-seat stadium at Phoenix Park in Thornbury, within the Leeds metropolitan district, but the site had to be sold before this was realised. In July 2008 Blackburn predicted on a supporters' forum that the club would reach the Football League within four years. In 2012, Bradford gained promotion to the Conference North by beating F.C. United of Manchester 1–0 in the playoff final.

Colours
The traditional colours of Bradford (PA) were red, amber and black; they were inherited from the original Bradford RFC, and retained by the Bradford & Bingley RFC and Bradford Bulls RLFC (all of whom claim a common genealogy). The fact that red, amber and black (with white) have been worn by three of the city's senior football clubs (Bradford (Park Avenue) AFC, Bradford RFC [Bradford & Bingley RFC] and Bradford Northern RLFC [Bradford Bulls], all descended from the original Bradford FC based at Park Avenue) has evoked the assumption that these were the official sporting colours of Bradford.

The colours have also been used by other sports organisations in Bradford (such as cycling, hockey and athletics as well as being the principal colours used by Bradford University sports teams), principally as a red, amber and black band on a white shirt (as worn by Bradford Northern and as an away kit by Bradford (PA)). Red, amber and black are also the colours of the Bradford Cricket Club, formed in 1836. The cricket club played at Park Avenue, where Yorkshire C.C.C. traditionally played several matches a season. Bradford FC was formed in 1863 by Bramham College alumni, and in 1880 joined Bradford CC at Park Avenue.

In 1911, Bradford changed its colours to green and white after the appointment of former Celtic player Tom Maley, brother of Willie Maley (who also played for Celtic before becoming their first manager). Avenue was the only club to wear green and white in the English First Division, between 1914 and 1921. The club reverted to red, amber and black with white in 1924, reviving green and white from 1958 to 1967. The reformed Bradford (Park Avenue) club has worn green and white since 1988. Avenue's club crest was the 1907 version of the Bradford coat of arms; this has also been used by the re-formed club, although it was replaced by the municipality in 1974.

Bradford's traditional rivals (Manningham RFC) and their successor, Bradford City, have worn claret and amber stripes; Bradford usually wears hoops. Bradford City also used the 1907 Bradford coat of arms as its crest until 1966.

Red, amber and black has occasionally returned in away strips, notably the club's 2007 centenary shirt (which featured the three colours as hoops). During the 2012–13 season, the club introduced a white home shirt with a red, amber and black sash to celebrate the 150th anniversary of the original club. The club retained a green-and-white striped away shirt.

Name
Although officially Bradford Football Club, the club was obliged to append Park Avenue (the location of the club's original stadium) in brackets to its name in 1907 to avoid confusion with Bradford City. However the club was historically always referred to simply as Bradford in fixture lists, classified results and the national press. However, since dropping into non-league the Park Avenue (or simply PA) are used as City are by far the better known team.

Current squad

Backroom staff

Managers

Honours and achievements

Association football
Football League Second Division (second tier)
Second place promotion: 1913–14

Football League Third Division North (third tier)
Champions: 1927–28
Second place promotion: 1922–23, 1925–26

Football League Fourth Division (fourth tier)
Fourth place promotion: 1960–61

Northern Premier League Division One / Premier Division (seventh tier)
Champions: 2000–01
Play-offs winners: 2012

Northern Premier League Division One North (eighth tier)
Champions: 2007–08

North West Counties Football League Division One (eighth tier)
Champions: 1994–95

North West Counties Football League Division Two (ninth tier)
Third place promotion: 1990–91

Rugby league
West Yorkshire League Championship: 1895–96
Challenge Cup: 1905–06
Yorkshire Cup: 1906–07

See also
List of Bradford (Park Avenue) A.F.C. players

References

External links

Ground profile
Horsfall Stadium
Early history of the club (1895–99)
Bradford (Park Avenue) History

 
1907 establishments in England
Association football clubs established in 1907
Sport in Bradford
Football clubs in West Yorkshire
Football clubs in England
Southern Football League clubs
Former English Football League clubs
Northern Premier League clubs
Central Midlands Football League
North West Counties Football League clubs
National League (English football) clubs
Phoenix clubs (association football)
Fan-owned football clubs in England
Founder members of the Northern Rugby Football Union
Defunct rugby league teams in England
Defunct English rugby union teams